Heidi J. Larson is an American anthropologist and the founding director of the Vaccine Confidence Project. Larson headed Global Immunisation Communication at UNICEF and she is the author of Stuck: How Vaccine Rumors Start and Why They Don't Go Away. She was recognized as one of the BBC's 100 women of 2021.

Education and early career
The daughter of a priest and civil rights advocate, Larson grew up in Massachusetts. She graduated from Kent School, Kent, Connecticut in 1975.

Larson worked for Save the Children in the West Bank and in Nepal after college. Working abroad got her interested in anthropology and she eventually graduated from the University of California in that discipline. She earned a Ph.D. in 1990. She worked for several companies in the 1990s, including Apple and Xerox. She went to UNICEF to study the impact of fax machines on how employees accomplish their work.

Work in immunisation
Larson went back to UNICEF in 2000, working on global communications for several of the agency's vaccination programs. She developed an expertise on working with local health workers to defuse rumors that threatened to derail vaccination initiatives. She founded the Vaccine Confidence Project at the London School of Hygiene & Tropical Medicine, which she still runs as of 2020, in addition to teaching anthropology, Risk and Decision Science.

Since 2015, Larson has been leading a European Union project to support vaccination efforts in Sierra Leone, Rwanda, the Democratic Republic of the Congo and Uganda, identifying and countering rumours that may reduce the effectiveness of the campaign. After working on ebola vaccination, the group is now debunking myths about the flu and COVID-19.

Larson is Director of European Initiatives at the Institute for Health Metrics and Evaluation (IHME) and a Clinical Associate Professor in the Department of Global Health at the University of Washington. Amid the COVID-19 pandemic, she co-chaired (alongside J. Stephen Morrison) the CSIS-LSHTM High-Level Panel on Vaccine Confidence and Misinformation in 2020.

Describing herself as "a patient optimist", Larson understood early that significant efforts had to be made to fight misinformation about vaccines. Former UNICEF Executive Director Carol Bellamy said Larson "wasn't yelling 'The sky is falling', she was yelling, 'The sky could fall if we don't do something'".

In a paper published in February 2021, Larson acknowledged extensive collaboration with, advisory board membership of, and funding from, vaccine manufacturers, especially the pharmaceutical companies GlaxoSmithKline and Merck & Co. Inc. She was recognized as one of the BBC's 100 women of 2021.

Personal life
Professor Larson is married to the Belgian virologist Peter Piot.

Selected publications

References

External links

1957 births
Living people
20th-century American anthropologists
21st-century American anthropologists
21st-century American women
Academics of the London School of Hygiene & Tropical Medicine
American women anthropologists
University of California, Berkeley alumni
Harvard College alumni
American women academics
Kent School alumni
Vaccination advocates
BBC 100 Women